The Georgian Erovnuli Liga 2,  organized since 1990 by GFF, serves as the second division of professional football in Georgia.

Under the current name the league was introduced for the 2017 season as a part of reorganization process of the entire league system. It was formerly known as Pirveli liga (the First league).

Structure
There are ten clubs competing in Erovnuli Liga 2. During the season each club plays against its rival four times, twice at home and twice away.

At the end of each season the winner gains automatic promotion and the bottom club is relegated. The runner-up and 3rd placed team participate in two-legged home and away play-off matches against the respectively 9th and 8th placed clubs of Erovnuli Liga.

In case two or more teams obtain an equal number of points, final standings are determined by an aggregate of the results between them.

Seasons run based on Spring-Autumn system.

Format 
Below is a complete record of how many teams have played in each season throughout the league's history.

Current members 

 
Based on their performance in the previous year, the following ten teams will compete in Erovnuli Liga 2 in the 2023 season.

Apart from Gareji Sagarejo, Dinamo Tbilisi-2 and Spaeri Tbilisi, all of them have previously taken part in the main division.

Clubs are listed in alphabetical order.

Results

Top three teams of Pirveli Liga

Top three teams of Erovnuli Liga 2

Relegation and Promotion from Erovnuli Liga 2

Promoted teams to Erovnuli Liga

Relegated teams to Liga 3

Performance per club
Since the restructuring into Liga 2 in 2017, 21 teams have spent at least one season in the division, including five of the ten clubs competing in the 2022 Erovnuli Liga.

Expelled from the league in May 2022 for match fixing.

The current status of these clubs as of 2022:

Top Goalscorers

Sponsors
In 2019 the Football Federation signed a sponsorship deal with Crystalbet. For this reason the league has since been formally referred to as Crystalbet Erovnuli Liga 2.

References

External links 
 
 Soccerway.com

 
2
Geo